Grolier was one of the largest American publishers of general encyclopedias, including The Book of Knowledge (1910), The New Book of Knowledge (1966), The New Book of Popular Science (1972), Encyclopedia Americana (1945), Academic American Encyclopedia (1980), and numerous incarnations of a CD-ROM encyclopedia (1986–2003).

As an educational publishing company Grolier was known for its presence in school libraries and its in-home encyclopedia sales. It also had a strong presence among parents of children under six years old, the market for Grolier's direct mail-to-the-home business.

In June 2000, Grolier became part of Scholastic Corporation, which now maintains Scholastic GO, formerly Grolier Online.

History

The company that became encyclopedia publisher Grolier Incorporated was founded by Walter M. Jackson (1863–1923) as the Grolier Society. Jackson had been the partner of Horace Everett Hooper in publishing the 10th edition of the Encyclopædia Britannica and in developing its 11th edition. He split with Hooper in 1908–1909 in a nasty legal fight after failing to wrest control of the Britannica from Hooper. 

The Grolier Society specialized in publishing extra-fine editions of classics and rare literature. The Society was named after the Grolier Club, which had been founded in 1884 to advance the arts involved in making books and which was itself named after a well-known French bibliophile, Jean Grolier de Servières. 

In 1910, Jackson purchased the rights to publish the British The Children's Encyclopædia under the name The Book of Knowledge.

In 1936, the company was acquired by its senior sales executive, Fred P. Murphy, who had joined the firm in 1912. Grolier's common stock began trading publicly in 1954, and it was listed on the New York Stock Exchange in 1965.  

Under Murphy's leadership, by the mid-1940s, Grolier became one of the largest publishers of general encyclopedias, including The Book of Knowledge and the Encyclopedia Americana. Grolier also published the Grolier Encyclopedia (based on the Harmsworth's Universal Encyclopedia and the Doubleday's Encyclopedia) (1941), American Peoples Encyclopedia (1962), The New Book of Knowledge (1966), the Academic American Encyclopedia (1980), The New Grolier Electronic Encyclopedia (1985 CD-ROM), and the Grolier Multimedia Encyclopedia (1995).

Grolier conducted its encyclopedia sales through subsidiaries Americana Corporation; The Grolier Society; Inc.; R.H. Hinckley Company; Spencer International Press, Inc.; and The Richards Company, Inc. Each subsidiary distributed publications as designated by Grolier. Murphy encouraged a productive rivalry among the subsidiaries, giving their executives broad authority and profit-sharing incentives.

In 1959, Murphy hired John G. Ryan, formerly president of competitor P.F. Collier & Son, as president of The Richards Company. By 1968, Richards' sales, distributing the American Peoples Encyclopedia, exceeded that of the other Grolier encyclopedia subsidiaries.

In 1968, Grolier's annual sales were over $181 million, and the company held a 30 percent market share as the leading publisher of encyclopedias in the United States. Grolier also established a successful mail order subsidiary. 

In the 1970s, Grolier declined financially. Fred Murphy retired, and the company merged the sales subsidiaries into what became a less profitable unitary sales force. Grolier also made ill-fated investments in non-publishing ventures, including mobile homes. In 1976, Grolier lost $77 million on sales of $247 million. It threatened to file for bankruptcy if its creditors did not agree to restructure its debts. In the 1980s, with its mail order business expanding, Grolier returned to profitability. 

On August 8, 1986, Grolier announced a joint venture partnership with Hal Roach Studios and Robert Halmi, Inc. (both of these companies were later known as Qintex Entertainment) to set up a joint venture, Grolier Home Video, which was designed to set up adaptations of the Grolier book properties. 

In 1988 Grolier was purchased by the French media company Hachette, which owned a well-known French-language encyclopedia, the Hachette Encyclopedia. The sale price was $450 million. Hachette was later absorbed by the French conglomerate, the Lagardère Group. 

In 1995, Grolier acquired the Chicago-based Children's Press.

In 1999, Grolier had revenues of $450 million and earnings of approximately $45 million, with $4.5 million in Internet revenues. It had a US$100 million international business, primarily located in the UK, Canada and Asia.

Grolier was purchased by Scholastic for US$400 million in June 2000. The new owners projected a 30% increase in operating income, although historically Grolier had experienced earnings of 7% to 8% on income.

Staff reductions as a means of controlling costs followed soon thereafter, even while an effort was made to augment the sales force. Cuts occurred every year between 2000 and 2007, leaving a much-depleted work force to carry out the duties of maintaining a large encyclopedia database. Scholastic, which specializes in works for the K-8 market (Kindergarten-to-8th grade), has sought to position the Encyclopedia Americana as a reference resource for schools. It remains to be seen whether that strategy, applied to a venerable upper-level (even adult-level) publication, will work in the long run.

The name Grolier is retained as the Scholastic website Scholastic GO. The company exists as Grolier Incorporated.

Imprints

Franklin Watts

Franklin Watts Inc. was formed in 1942. The company was sold to Grolier in 1957. When the namesake founder retired in 1967, he moved to London to start Franklin Watts Ltd. in 1969. Franklin Watts retired again in 1976.

When Grolier acquired Children's Press in 1995, much of Franklin Watts were published under the Children's Press imprint. When Hachette sold Grolier to Scholastic Corporation in 2000, Scholastic took U.S. rights to Children's Press and Franklin Watts as well. The UK branch exists today as an imprint of Hachette UK's Hachette Children's Books.

Orchard Books

Orchard Books was founded in 1986 by Grolier as a children's publisher. When editors Neal Porter, Richard Jackson and Melanie Kroupa left Orchard for DK in 1996, Grolier sued the trio. DK and Grolier settled the lawsuit. When Hachette sold Grolier to Scholastic Corporation in 2000, they included the U.S. branch of Orchard Books while retaining the UK branch.

CD-ROM
Grolier's first CD-ROM publication was the text-only Academic American Encyclopedia on CD-ROM in 1985, and was one of the first commercial CD-ROM titles. The text was based on the Academic American Encyclopedia, which comprised 30,000 entries and 9 million words. The editions were updated quarterly—a rate which outpaced the print edition. Eventually, the CD-ROM edition was quite different from the print edition.

Grolier published the encyclopedia with numerous name variations: The Electronic Encyclopedia (1986), The Grolier Electronic Encyclopedia (1987), The New Grolier Electronic Encyclopedia (1988–91), The New Grolier Multimedia Encyclopedia (1992). The 1990 edition was the first to feature pictures, and the 1992 edition was the first to deliver video and sound. The last CD-ROM edition published was the 2003 Grolier Multimedia Encyclopedia.

Video games
In 1982 Grolier formed a subsidiary called Grolier Electronic Publishing Inc. Grolier Electronic Publishing Inc. was renamed Grolier Interactive Inc. in February 1996. They made electronic encyclopedias for the Amiga and video games for DOS, Windows, Macintosh and the PlayStation.
 
The video games they released include:

Grolier Interactive ceased releasing video games when Grolier was bought by Scholastic.

See also
List of online encyclopedias

References

External links
 Grolier's Official homepage
 Grolier Interactive's Official homepage (old, no longer in use)
 Grolier Interactive's Official Games Page (archived)

American online encyclopedias
Publishing companies established in 1909
Publishing companies disestablished in 2000
Publishing companies of the United States
1909 establishments in New York (state)
Reference publishers
Scholastic Corporation